In optimal control theory, a transversality condition is a boundary condition for the terminal values of the costate variables. They are one of the necessary conditions for optimality infinite-horizon optimal control problems without an endpoint constraint on the state variables.

See also 
 Pontryagin's maximum principle

Further reading 
 
 

Boundary conditions
Optimal control